Megachile zingowli is a species of bee in the family Megachilidae. It was described by Cheesman in 1936.

References

Zingowli
Insects described in 1936